Battle Hill may mean:
Places
Battle Hill (Brooklyn), New York City
Battle Hill Farm Forest Park, New Zealand
 Battle Hill, Georgia, now the Westview neighborhood of Atlanta
 Battle Hill, White Plains, New York
Battle Hill Township, McPherson County, Kansas
 Gitwangak Battle Hill National Historic Site in Canada
 Battle Hill, an area of North Tyneside in England

Events
Battle of Battle Hill, New Zealand